The Philadelphia Eagles Santa Claus incident, also referred to as The Santa Claus Game, was an American football game in the 1968 season of the National Football League between the visiting Minnesota Vikings and the Philadelphia Eagles. 

The incident occurred on December 15, 1968, in Week 14, at the time the final week of the NFL season, with the struggling Eagles sitting at 2–11 on the season. Tied 7–7 at halftime, the team brought out Santa Claus as part of the halftime Christmas parade, but Eagles fans upset by the poor season pelted him with snowballs. 

The affair has gone down in NFL and sports lore as a representation of the passion, but also the outrageous behavior of Philadelphia sports fans.

Background
The Eagles entered their final game of the 1968 season with a 2–11 record. According to Pro Football Hall of Fame sportswriter Ray Didinger, the 1968 Eagles team was at the time the franchise's worst year. However, fans were especially frustrated because while the Eagles started 0–11 they had won two games and were not bad enough to secure the #1 pick in the 1969 NFL/AFL draft and the eventual rights to running back O. J. Simpson. Some fans wore buttons to the game reading "Joe Must Go," in reference to head coach Joe Kuharich, and a plane with a banner circled the stadium with the same message. The game was also the last Eagles game played on grass at Franklin Field. Leonard Tose, who bought the Eagles before the 1969 season from Jerry Wolman, directed the team to install AstroTurf as Franklin Field's playing surface. 

The Eagles took an early 7–0 lead in the game much to the dismay of fans, who wanted an Eagles loss to ensure a good draft pick. At halftime, the game was tied 7–7.

The incident
The night before the game at Franklin Field there was a substantial snowstorm that left most of the stadium, including the seats, covered in snow. At kickoff, temperatures were in the low 20 degrees (Fahrenheit) and wind gusts reached 30 miles per hour. The snow storm prevented the Santa Claus that the Eagles had booked for the halftime Christmas pageant from arriving at the game. Bill "Moon" Mullen, who was the Eagles' entertainment director, needing someone to play Santa Claus during the halftime Christmas pageant, picked out Frank Olivo, a 20-year-old fan who was dressed as Santa Claus, to play the role. Olivo, who regularly attended Eagles games, would always dress as Santa Claus for the last regular season game of the year.

Olivo appeared at the underbelly of Franklin Field to the song "Here Comes Santa Claus" alongside a 50-piece band and Eagles cheerleaders dressed as elves. Olivo was supposed to appear on a large Christmas float featuring eight life-sized fiberglass reindeer, but the float got stuck in the mud, so Olivo was forced to appear in the Christmas pageant on foot. In place of carrying a Santa sack, Olivo carried an equipment bag filled with soggy towels. Philadelphia sports talk radio host Glen Macnow described the incident as "a bad game, it's a cold game, [the fans] are sitting their rear ends in snow and here comes this lousy, little Santa running down the field." 

Olivo's cousin, who witnessed the spectacle, stated "[Olivio] comes out, the PA announcer goes through this big thing, 'Here comes Santa Claus. Let's give Santa Claus a rousing welcome, Philadelphia welcome' [and well]...all hell broke loose." Olivo began his appearance by throwing candy canes to the fans, but when he reached the endzone fans started booing and throwing snowballs at him.  Fans then soon started throwing other projectiles including beer bottles and hoagies at him. Olivo suspects that he was hit with more than 100 snowballs during his appearance. So many snowballs were thrown at Olivo that his fake white eyebrows, which were part of the costume, were knocked off. However, he took the pelting in jest, shouting at one fan "you're not getting anything for Christmas." Olivo later stated that he understood why fans were frustrated and that fans were not booing him, but the disappointing season. There is no video of Eagles fans throwing snowballs at Olivo. 

The Eagles' public relations director at the time, Jim Gallagher, said that Olivo "was the worst-looking Santa I'd ever seen. Bad suit, scraggly beard. I'm not sure whether he was drunk, but he appeared to be." However, Olivo contests that his costume was high quality and he was not drunk, but conceded his fake beard was poor quality.

Aftermath

The Eagles gifted Olivo football-shaped cufflinks and a tie tack as a gift in appreciation of his services. The incident did not immediately receive much attention with little mention being given to it in The Philadelphia Inquirer and Philadelphia Bulletin. However, the incident gained national infamy after being mentioned by Howard Cosell on the ABC Weekend Report with the incident being featured in lieu of game highlights. In 1969, the Eagles offered Olivo a chance to be Santa Claus once again in the team's Christmas pageant, but he declined.

The incident is often used by the media as an example of the negative image surrounding Philadelphia sports fans. CBS Sports used the Santa Claus incident as an example for why Philadelphia sports fans are "the absolute worst." ESPN said that with the incident "a city cemented its reputation as the harshest place in sports" and it will go down as "a staple of Philadelphia history." SB Nation has said that "Philadelphia fans throwing snowballs at Santa Claus is a topic that can come up during any Eagles broadcast, and maybe even other professional Philly sports games, too." Some Eagles fans view the incident in an illustrious light as an example of the city's no-nonsense attitude about sports. Regarding the incident, Olivo said "It happened...years ago, you know, time to move on...It went away for a while, but every now and then you hear some guy on TV who only knows Philly for the cheesesteaks and the Liberty Bell talk about the time fans threw snowballs at Santa. It was cool to hear it back then when it went national and Howard Cosell is saying your name on TV, but today when you hear it, it's like, 'Shut up already.' "

In 2003, Olivo appeared at a Philadelphia 76ers game, as part of the team's effort to gather the most Santa Clauses in one location, dressed as Santa Claus. Fans originally started cheering Olivo, but the cheers turned into a chorus of boos. A song titled "The Great Santa Snowball Debacle of 1968" was released in 2006. In 2009, Olivo returned to an Eagles game dressed as Santa Claus. A book titled A Snowball's Chance: Philly Fires Back Against The National Media, which defended the Eagles fans' behavior in the incident, was published in 2012. Olivo died in 2015 at the age of 66 following lifelong problems with his heart. In 2017, ESPN made a spoof 30 for 30 documentary about the incident. The incident was featured as a question on Jeopardy! in 2021 and was correctly answered by 38-time champion Matt Amodio. At times, Eagles management continues to prevent fans from dressing as Santa Claus to games when there is snow in the weather forecast in order to prevent a similar incident from occurring.

During the 2022 National League Championship Series, a fan dressed as Santa Claus, attended Games 4 and 5 at Citizens Bank Park in Philadelphia. When shown on the jumbotron, he was greeted with cheers.

See also
National Football League controversies
1968 NFL season
1968 Philadelphia Eagles season

References 

1968 National Football League season
1968 in sports in Pennsylvania
1960s in Pennsylvania
American football incidents
Philadelphia Eagles
Minnesota Vikings
National Football League games
National Football League controversies
December 1968 sports events in the United States
Santa Claus